Martin Lejeune (born 27 July 1980 in Hanover) is a German activist.

Lejeune spent his childhood and youth in Nuremberg and Bielefeld. He passed the Abitur through a Second Chance School (CEE). Starting in 2004, he read for a degree in political science from Otto-Suhr-Institut of the Free University of Berlin.

He covered the 2014 Israel–Gaza conflict remotely. He referred to the unlawful executions of 18 Palestinians in Gaza as to have "taken place very socially".

References

External links
Official website
Official Twitter handle
Official YouTube channel

1980 births
German war correspondents
Living people
German male journalists
People from Hanover
Free University of Berlin alumni
Mass media people from Lower Saxony